The Uzbekistan women's national under-20 football team represents Uzbekistan in international football competitions at the qualifications of AFC U-19 Women's Championship and possible final tournaments if they qualify, as well as any other under-19 women's international football tournaments. It is governed by the Uzbekistan Football Federation.

Results and fixtures

The following is a list of match results in the last 12 months, as well as any future matches that have been scheduled.

 Legend

2022

2023

Players

Current squad
 The following players were called up for the 2023 JFA Women's U-20 Trio Tournament matches.
 Match dates: 17 and 19 February 2023
 Opposition:  and

Competitive record

AFC U-20 Women's Asian Cup

CAFA U-20 Women's Championship

See also

Sport in Uzbekistan
Football in Uzbekistan
Women's football in Uzbekistan
Uzbekistan women's national football team
Uzbekistan women's national under-17 football team
Uzbekistan men's national football team

References

External links
Official website 
FIFA profile 

women U20
Uzbekistan
Women's football in Uzbekistan
European women's national under-20 association football teams